Sena III was King of Anuradhapura in the 10th century, whose reign lasted from 955 to 964. He succeeded his brother Udaya II as King of Anuradhapura and was succeeded by Udaya III.

See also
 List of Sri Lankan monarchs
 History of Sri Lanka

References

External links
 Kings & Rulers of Sri Lanka
 Codrington's Short History of Ceylon

Monarchs of Anuradhapura
S
S
S